The 1980 New Zealand Grand Prix was a race held at the Pukekohe Park Raceway on 13 January 1980.  The race had 15 competitors.

It was the 26th New Zealand Grand Prix. The race was won by New Zealander Steve Millen for the first time in the Ralt RT1. The rest of the podium was completed by fellow Kiwi Dave McMillan and Italian Andrea de Cesaris.

Classification

Qualifying

Race

References

Grand Prix
New Zealand Grand Prix
January 1980 sports events in New Zealand